The 2009 Sony Ericsson Open women's singles was the women's singles event of the 2009 Sony Ericsson Open, a WTA Premier Mandatory tennis tournament held in Key Biscayne, Florida in late March and early April. World No. 1 Serena Williams was the defending champion and attempting to win a record sixth title at the tournament, but she lost in the final to Victoria Azarenka, 6–3, 6–1. Azarenka won her third WTA singles title and first at the Premier or above level.

Seeds
All seeds received a bye into the second round.

Draw

Finals

Top half

Section 1

Section 2

Section 3

Section 4

Bottom half

Section 5

Section 6

Section 7

Section 8

References

External links
Draw and Qualifying Draw

Sony Ericsson Open - Women's Singles
2009 Sony Ericsson Open